Mashava, originally known as Mashaba, is a mining village in Masvingo Province, Zimbabwe.

References 
This city is one of many mining cities in Zimbabwe although there isn't many blueprints for the mines it is still a part of Zimbabwe's economy, because of the resources that can be collected.      

Populated places in Masvingo Province